Piers Butler of Duiske, Barrowmount, County Kilkenny (died 1650) was the son of Edward Butler, 1st Viscount Galmoye and Hon. Anne Butler, daughter of Edmund Butler, 2nd Viscount Mountgarret. He gained the rank of Colonel of Dragoons. After the Battle of Lambstown, County Wexford, he was taken prisoner, and was "killed, it is said after quarter being given" by the Cromwellian Captain William Bolton.

Marriage and issue
He married Hon. Margaret Netterville, the daughter of Nicholas Netterville, 1st Viscount Netterville of Dowth, County Meath and his first wife Eleanor Bathe of Drumcondra. Their children were: 
 Hon. Richard Butler, died without male issue
 Frances Butler, married Hervey Morres, grandfather of  Hervey Morres, 1st Viscount Mountmorres
 Edward Butler, 2nd Viscount Galmoye (b. circa 1627, d. after 24 Oct 1667)
 Nicholas Butler (d. 1653)
 James Butler (d. 1678)
 Major Edmond Butler of Killoshulan (d. 12 Jul 1691)
 Jane Butler
 Mary Butler
 Elizabeth Grace
 Margaret Grace
 Eleanor Butler, married to William Grace, Esq., of Ballylinch

See also
 Butler dynasty

References

1650 deaths
Irish soldiers
Piers
People from County Kilkenny
17th-century Irish people
People of the Irish Confederate Wars
Year of birth unknown